The Bulldog Bash was an annual motorcycle rally, with a reported attendance of 50,000 people in 2007. It was held over a weekend in mid-August, at the former Shakespeare County Raceway, situated outside of Stratford-upon-Avon in England. The last event was in 2017, as the planned 2018 weekend was cancelled due to the venue being sold for housing development.

History
The event started as a small gathering organised by the Hells Angels motorcycle club for bikers. Since 1987, the event grew to one of the largest motorcycle festivals in Europe, with a record 50,000 people reported to have attended in 2007.

It is believed that the popularity of the event was due to the organisers' philosophy of hosting a festival that meets all the criteria of their own 'perfect party', organised by bikers, for bikers.

The festival was hosted at the Shakespeare County Raceway in the village of Long Marston, Warwickshire, England since 1987, and always occurred in mid-August. Since its inception, it has followed largely the same format (though expanded for larger crowds and included bigger name bands): providing entertainment aimed at the motorcycle riding fraternity, including live rock music, beer tents, motorcycle racing, drag racing and stunt riding demonstrations. Adult entertainment traditionally featured high on the bill, including a wet T-shirt contest, erotic dance shows and a topless bike wash.

The event was held over four days, with gates opening on Thursday, running through until Sunday.

In April 2013 it was announced that the 2013 event had been cancelled.
The event returned in 2014 and for 2015.

Comparable events in the USA, on a much larger scale, are Sturgis Motorcycle Rally and Daytona Beach Bike Week.

Security and crime
Despite the general public's association of violence and crime with the Hells Angels, the Bulldog Bash had a consistent record of causing the Warwickshire Police little trouble, compared to other events of this scale.

There were no police patrols at the site, and no personal searches conducted by police. The Hells Angels maintained security inside the festival grounds themselves.

Inspector Dave Patterson from the Warwickshire Police is quoted to have said about the 2006 event: "There was just four crimes reported on site and only three arrests during the four-day event. Although traffic to and from the Long Marston site was greater than normal, the traffic plan worked well."

The four crimes recorded on the Police Media Portal were all related to theft.

Charities
The Hells Angels's Bulldog Bash 2015 raised £750 for the Coventry and Warwickshire Living Well with Dementia Partnership charity.

References

Further reading
"Warwickshire Police have pledged to continue trying to stop an annual event organised by the Hells Angels, despite it passing off peacefully.", BBC 10 August 2009
"Police apply for Bulldog review", BBC 25 June 2009
"Police in Bulldog Bash objection". BBC 30 April 2008
Newbigging, Chris "Full highlights from Bulldog Bash". MCN August 2007.
Langley, Tess "Bulldog Bash revs up". BBC Coventry and Warwickshire Features
Sturcke, James "The ordinary lives of Hells Angels' bikers". The Guardian  13 August 2007
Harkness, Timandra "Angels". The Telegraph 4 September 2004
BBC. "Music and machines at the bash", BBC Coventry and Warwickshire Features
King, Rich. "Bulldog Bash 2003", American-V, August 2003.
Rainey, Joy. "Grab some leathers and 'run what ya brung'". The Telegraph 20 October 2002
King, Rich. "Bulldog Bash 2002", American-V, August 2002.

Hells Angels
Motorcycle rallies in the United Kingdom